Silja Vöneky (born September 3, 1969) is a German jurist, specializing in international law and philosophy of law. She is a professor of public law, international law, and ethics of law at the University of Freiburg.

Life 

She studied law and philosophy of law at the University of Freiburg, the University of Bonn, the University of Edinburgh, and the University of Heidelberg, completing her judicial clerkship (Referendariat) at the Kammergericht in Berlin. Thereafter, Vöneky wrote her dissertation on environmental protection in armed conflicts at the Max Planck Institute for Comparative Public Law and International Law in Heidelberg under Rüdiger Wolfrum. There she was head of the independent Max Planck research group on the "Democratic Legitimacy of Ethical Decisions". In the framework of this research, she coined the concept 'ethicalization of the law'. In 2009, she completed her habilitation at the University of Heidelberg with a work on law, morality, ethics, and issues of democratic legitimation.

In 2012, she was appointed to a four-year term as a member of the German Ethics Council on the proposal of the German Federal Government and was head of the Council's working group on biosecurity, which – at the request of the German Federal Ministries of Research and of Health – issued a report on the freedom and responsibility of research with respect to biosecurity that attracted international interest. In addition, she is a founding member of the Cambridge Working Group.

Since 2001 Silja Vöneky is legal advisor to the German Federal Foreign Office concerning the Arctic and Antarctic, member of the German Delegation to the ATCMs (Antarctic Treaty Consultative Meetings), and she prepared the German Draft Law for the Implementation of the Liability Annex to the Protocol on Environmental Protection to the Antarctic Treaty for the German Ministry of Environment. In the 2015-2016 academic year, Silja Vöneky is a visiting fellow at the Human Rights Programme at Harvard Law School and is conducting research on the topic "Human Rights and Governance of Existential Risks" in connection with "Human Rights, Legitimacy, and Democracy in the 21st Century". Silja Vöneky will continue her work on questions of risk governance on the basis of international law during the winter semester 2018 for one year as a Fellow of the 2018-2019 FRIAS Research Group on Responsible Artificial Intelligence (Emerging ethical, legal, philosophical and social aspects of the interaction between humans and autonomous intelligent systems).

Representative writings in English 

 Security Interests, Human Rights, and Espionage in the Second Machine Age – NSA Mass Surveillance and the Framework of Public International Law, FIP 3/2015.
 Biosecurity – Freedom, Responsibility, and Legitimacy of Research, in Ordnung der Wissenschaft 2/2015, available at: http://www.ordnungderwissenschaft.de/
 Foundations and Limits of an Ethicalization of Law, in F. Battaglia, N. Mukerji, J. Nida-Rümelin (eds.), Rethinking Responsibility in Science and Technology, 2014, pp. 183–202 
 Implementation and Enforcement of International Humanitarian Law, Chapter 14, in D. Fleck (ed.), The Handbook of International Humanitarian Law, 3. Edition, 2013, pp. 647–700
 Francis Lieber (1798-1872), in B. Fassbender, A. Peters, S. Peter (eds.), The Oxford Handbook of the History of International Law, 2012, pp. 1137–1141 
 The Fight against Terrorism and the Rules of International Law - Comment on Papers and Speeches of John B. Bellinger, Chief Legal Advisor to the United States Department, in R. A. Miller (ed.), Comparative Law as Transnational Law, A Decade of the German Law Journal, Oxford 2012, pp. 353–362.
 Analogy in International Law, in R. Wolfrum (ed.), Max Planck Encyclopedia of Public International Law, Vol. I, 2012, pp. 374–380, available at: http://www.mpepil.com
 Antarctica, in R. Wolfrum (ed.), Max Planck Encyclopedia of Public International Law, Vol. I, 2012, pp. 418–435 (together with S. Addison-Agyei), available at: http://www.mpepil.com
 Environment, Protection in Armed Conflict, in R. Wolfrum (ed.), Max Planck Encyclopedia of Public International Law, Vol. III, 2012, pp. 509–518 (together with R. Wolfrum), available at: http://www.mpepil.com
 The Liability Annex to the Protocol on Environmental Protection to the Antarctic Treaty, in D. König/ P.-T. Stoll/ V. Röben/ N. Matz-Lück (eds.), International Law Today: New Challenges and the Need for Reform?, Heidelberg 2008, pp. 165–197.

References

External links
 Website of Silja Vöneky at the University of Freiburg
 Silja Vöneky on Twitter
 Profile of Silja Vöneky on AcademiaNet, a database on German and European women academics and scientists
 Profile of Silja Vöneky at the Harvard Law School Human Rights Program

1969 births
Living people
German jurists
Academic staff of the University of Freiburg
Max Planck Institute for Comparative Public Law and International Law people